Praeacrospila pellucidalis is a moth in the family Crambidae. It was described by Paul Dognin in 1904. It is found in Ecuador.

References

Spilomelinae
Moths described in 1904